Serbian Luxembourger are citizens of Luxembourg who are of Serbian origin. According to the Serbian Ambassador to Belgium and Luxembourg, there are approximately 7,000 Serbs living in Luxembourg, approximately 1.2% of its population.

Notable people

Sergio Pupovac, footballer
Vahid Selimović, footballer
Danel Sinani, footballer
Meris Šehović, politician

References

Luxembourg
 
Luxembourg
Luxembourg
Luxembourg